Consuelo Scerri Herrera (born 10 October 1965) is a Maltese judge.

See also 
Judiciary of Malta

References

External links
https://www.timesofmalta.com/articles/view/20180625/local/consuelo-scerri-herrera-was-long-overdue-for-promotion-pm.682806

Living people
21st-century Maltese judges
Maltese women
1965 births
21st-century women judges